The 2021–22 Women's EHF Champions League was the 29th edition of Europe's premier club handball tournament, running from 11 September 2021 to 5 June 2022.

Because of the COVID-19 pandemic, each local health department allowed a different number of spectators.

Vipers Kristiansand defended their title after a finals win over Győri Audi ETO KC.

Format
The competition began with a group stage featuring 16 teams divided in two groups. Matches were played in a double round-robin system with home-and-away fixtures. In Groups A and B, the top two teams qualified for the quarterfinals, with teams ranked third to sixth entering the playoffs.

The knockout stage included four rounds: the round of 16, quarterfinals, and a final-four tournament comprising two semifinals and the final. The teams were paired against each other in two-legged home-and-away matches, with the aggregate winners qualifying to the next round. 

In the final four tournament, the semifinals and the final were played as single matches at a pre-selected host venue.

Team allocation

A total of 21 teams from 15 countries submitted their application for a place in the competition's group stage before the deadline of 21 June 2021. The final list of 16 participants was revealed by the EHF Executive Committee on 29 June 2021.

1: As the German club did not play the play-off matches vs Metz in the previous season, a deposit of an amount of €140,000 in two instalments was requested from Dortmund to cover any financial damages or requests for refunds in case the club would not play certain matches or drop out of the competition again. In case no payments were requested neither from the club nor from the EHF in this relation the deposit was transferred back to the club. The receipt of the two instalments (the first by 13 and the second by 27 July) was a precondition to uphold the participation of the club in the DELO EHF Champions League 2021/22, otherwise, the substitute club (DHK Banik Most) would have replaced Borussia Dortmund.

Group stage

The draw took place on 2 July 2021.

Group A

Group B

Knockout stage

Playoffs

Quarterfinals

Final four
The final four will held at the MVM Dome in Budapest, Hungary on 4 and 5 June 2022.

Bracket

Final

Top goalscorers

Awards
The all-star team was announced on 3 June 2022.

References

External links
Official website

 
2020
2021 in handball
2021 in European sport
2022 in European sport